The Eternaut is a science fiction Argentine comic created by Héctor Germán Oesterheld with artwork by Francisco Solano López. It was first published in Hora Cero Semanal between 1957 and 1959. Since its original release it has been hailed as a universal masterpiece of its genre, especially in South America.

Oesterheld returned to El Eternauta with a remake published in 1969 (illustrated by Alberto Breccia and left unfinished), and a sequel, El Eternauta II, published in 1976 (working again with Solano López). Both works featured a more overtly political subtext and story, as Oesterheld was increasingly concerned and disturbed by the political conditions of his country and region. By the time HGO (as he's popularly known in Argentina) published El Eternauta II in 1976, he and his daughters had already joined the leftist guerrilla group Montoneros, and one year later he was disappeared —along with almost all of his family— by the National Reorganization Process.

Since the restoration of democracy in the country in 1983, El Eternauta has been continued in a string of different sequels and versions by a variety of writers and artists, while the original work is now considered as the most important and influential historieta/comic of Argentina.

Publication history
The Eternauta was first published in Hora Cero Suplemento Semanal on September 4, 1957. Quickly becoming a success, the serial publication ran until 1959. It was reissued in 1961 in a dedicated magazine, Eternauta, published by Editorial Emilio Ramírez.

In 1969, the comic's author Héctor Germán Oesterheld rewrote El Eternauta, with changes to the story, more political references and more violence. It became an open critique of dictatorial regimes and United States' imperialism. This version featured artwork by Alberto Breccia, who drew the story in an experimental and unique style diverging from the original expression. It was first published on May 29, 1969 in the weekly Gente. The following years the series was also published in several European magazines, such as Linus, El Globo, Alter Alter, Il Mago, Charlie Mensuel and Metal Hurlant.

In December 1975, Ediciones Record began publishing new episodes of Eternauta II in Skorpio. Oesterheld resumed the story, with artwork once again by the original version's Francisco Solano López. Disturbed by the Dirty War and political repression of the period, Oesterheld criticized the dictatorship. He placed himself as a narrating character within the story. Having joined the banned leftist organization Montoneros with his daughters, Oesterheld wrote the chapters from hidden locations. He disappeared in 1977. Oesterheld is believed to have died after 1979, when he was last reported alive. His daughters also disappeared, as were their husbands. Only his widow and two grandsons survived, the youngest boy recovered from government custody after being born while his mother was in prison.

Other authors have continued the saga. A third part, El Eternauta, Tercera Parte (1983), published after the restoration of democracy, met with moderate success. It was criticized for being just another sci-fi comic instead of a continuation of the series' political content. Later chapters, El mundo arrepentido and El Eternauta, El regreso, again feature artwork by Solano López.

In 2015, Fantagraphics Books published the first translation of the work into English, under the title The Eternaut. It was translated by Erica Mena. The publication won the 2016 Eisner Award of the category, "Best Archival Collection/Project - Strips".

Italian comics magazine L'Eternauta, started in 1982, took its title from the lead character. It initially featured Ongaro's 1983 work on the series. Italian pop-rock band Eternauti also took its name from this comic.

By Oesterheld
El Eternauta (1957) (script) and F. Solano López (art)
El Eternauta, segunda parte (1976) (script) and F. Solano López (art)
El Eternauta, remake (1969) (script) and A. Breccia (art)

By others
El Eternauta, tercera parte (1983) by Alberto Ongaro (script), Mario Morhain and Oswal (art)
Eternauta, el mundo arrepentido (1997–1998) by Pablo Maiztegui (script) and Solano López (art)
El Eternauta, el odio cosmico (1999) by Pablo Muñoz, Ricardo Barreiro (script), Walther Taborda and Gabriel Rearte (art)
El Eternauta, el Regreso (2003–2006) Pablo Maiztegui (script) and F. Solano López (art)
El Eternauta, 50 aniversario (2007)
El Eternauta, Odio Cósmico Libro (2008)

Plot
The original comic's story begins as a mysterious deadly snowfall suddenly covers Buenos Aires and the surrounding metropolitan area, wiping out most life in a few hours. Juan Salvo, along with a couple of friends (Favalli, Lucas and Polski who were playing truco at his house), his wife and daughter remain safe from the lethal snowflakes thanks to the protection of Juan Salvo's home and the cleverness of Favalli. They organize to survive the ordeal, making special suits to be able to leave the house to gather supplies. During these trips they find Pablo, a twelve-year-old boy, and realize that crazed or needy survivors may be as much of a threat as the deadly snow.

A few days into the snowfall, they learn that the phenomenon was caused by an extraterrestrial invasion to Earth. They are recruited by the army to fight the invaders. During this time, Salvo meets and befriends a few of his fellow soldiers, namely Franco, a lathe operator, and Mosca, a journalist. As they march towards the country's capital city, they fight on different occasions against giant insects (Cascarudos, "Beetles"); a humanoid species with many more fingers than humans, especially on their right hands (Manos, "Hands"); giant armored elephantine beasts capable of knocking buildings down (Gurbos); and fellow men who were captured and altered (Hombres-robot, "Robot-men"). All of these beings are pawns, remotely controlled through implants or fear devices by the real invaders, los Ellos ("Them"), unseen creatures who remain hidden, controlling everything from the distance.

After managing a few victories, their forces suffer defeats and get reduced to a few men. Juan Salvo decides to return to his wife and daughter to go into hiding with them. A passing nuclear missile convinces Favalli and Franco that a larger global war has begun and that they cannot return empty-handed. Salvo reluctantly agrees to join them. After the trio attacks the aliens' HQ in Buenos Aires, they flee just before the city is destroyed by a nuclear attack.

Gradually, the aliens lure the pockets of survivors throughout the country to "snow-free zones" as part of an elaborate ruse. Salvo's group splits, and he tries to escape with his wife and daughter using one of the alien spaceships. He accidentally triggers a time travel apparatus in the craft. As a result, the three are lost in separate time dimensions known as "continuums". Juan Salvo begins to travel through time seeking them, eventually being named Eternauta, a voyager of eternity.

Analysis
Numerous comic book artists and members of the specialized press have remarked on Oesterheld's amplitude of subtle interpretations, veiled references and double readings. Oesterheld indicated that the protagonists were always a group of people - sometimes bigger, sometimes smaller - something he terms a "group hero" or "hero-in-group." He believed this was a more valuable concept than the traditional individual hero who appears to triumph without help from others.

Critics have frequently likened the invaders and their methods as veiled references to the various military-led coups which occurred at the time in the country. The three versions written by Oesterheld (the first part, its remake and the second part) were contemporaneous with the de facto governments of Pedro Eugenio Aramburu, Juan Carlos Onganía and the Proceso de Reorganización Nacional, respectively.

It has also been noted that, except for the "Ellos", none of the invaders is truly evil; they are noble beings forced to carry out the orders of others. Critics believe Oesterheld was conceptually attacking the Dirty War or writing an allegory of class struggle.

Adaptation
Directors such as Adolfo Aristarain, Fernando Solanas or Gustavo Mosquera expressed interest in a film adaptation, but could not manage reasonable production costs.

In 2008, under supervision by Elsa Oesterheld, the writer's widow, an Italian production company worked on a film adaptation of the original comic. The story would be set in Buenos Aires and the possibility of co-producing the film with INCAA was discussed. Lucrecia Martel was reported as slated to direct the film and said that production was already past the "embryonic stages." In 2009, however, Martel was dropped due to conceptual differences with the producers.

On September 4, 2017, on the 60th anniversary of the comic's release, a group of independent artists from Argentina presented an animated short film called “60 seconds of darkness”, an adaptation of a small fragment of the original comic.

In February 2020, it was announced that The Eternaut would be adapted into a TV series for Netflix. The series will be directed by Bruno Stagnaro and will be contextualized in the present.

References

External links
 Historia de El Eternauta - Historieteca 
 Official site 
 Hector Oesterheld's The Eternaut translated synopsis
 Translated into English (excerpt)

1957 comics debuts
1959 comics endings
Alien invasions in comics
Argentine comic strips
Argentine comics titles
Comics about time travel
Comics by Héctor Germán Oesterheld
Comics characters introduced in 1957
Drama comics
Eisner Award winners
Fantagraphics titles
Fictional Argentine people
Science fiction comics